Józef Tusk (23 March 1907 – 12 June 1987) was the grandfather of the former Prime Minister of Poland, Donald Tusk. During World War II, he served in the Wehrmacht, which proved to be controversial during the 2005 Polish presidential election. He worked as a luthier.

Biography
A member of the Lechitic (West Slavic) Kashubian minority, Józef Tusk was born in Emaus - a suburb of Danzig, German Empire to a working class Catholic family of Józef Tusk (1870–1910) and Augustyna Tusk (née Adamczyk; 1870–1962). He became a citizen of the Free City of Danzig after World War I and worked for the Polish railway in the Free City. He became a member of the Polish Secret Military Organization (Tajna Organizacja Wojskowa, TOW), which prepared behind-the-lines operatives in case of the war. On 1 September 1938 Tusk was placed in the position of the telegraphist in the Danzig (Gdańsk) railway station. It is likely, but not confirmed, that he had been working with the Polish intelligence services. On 1 September 1939, when Germany invaded Poland, the Free City of Danzig was incorporated into the German Reich and the citizens of the Free City became German nationals. Tusk was assaulted in his house in the morning, and later witnessed German arrests of Poles at the railway station, and the Defence of the Polish Post in Danzig.

Józef Tusk reported the assault to Danzig police, and was subsequently arrested as a Polish activist, described as a "Polish fanatic, dangerous to the security of the German State"; his family on the same day was evicted from their house. Tusk was a forced laborer working in the construction of the Stutthof concentration camp In 1941 he was interviewed by Gestapo and imprisoned in Neuengamme concentration camp. On 26 August 1942 he was released from Neuengamme.

On 2 August 1944 Tusk was conscripted into Wehrmacht, into the 328. Grenadier-Ersatz- und Ausbildungsbatallion (328th Grenadier Replacement and Training Battalion). After about four months, around 24 November 1944 or soon afterward, he either deserted, defecting to the Polish Armed Forces in the West, or was imprisoned in an Allied prisoners-of-war camp.

Józef Tusk returned to Sopot, where his family moved to, in the People's Republic of Poland, in mid-October 1945. According to his family and friends, he never spoke much about his wartime history.

Legacy
Tusk's conscription to Wehrmacht proved to be controversial during the 2005 Polish presidential election, when it was called the "Wehrmacht affair" (Polish: Afera wehrmachtowa), and the most heated issue of the campaign. Similar instances of Poles forced to serve in the German army have proven controversial, particularly after the war, but even in modern Poland saying that a family member served in the German Army is looked down upon. Józef's grandson, Donald Tusk, was a presidential candidate from the Civic Platform party, and the claim that his grandfather served in the Wehrmacht gained notoriety in the media after it was made by the politician from an opposing party, Jacek Kurski from Law and Justice (PiS). This was seen as an attempt to damage Tusk's reputation, by an association with Wehrmacht, the army of Nazi Germany, seen quite negatively in Poland. Donald Tusk stated that he had no knowledge of this part of his family's history; sources vary on the extent to which the revelation had any impact on the presidential campaign, which was eventually won by Tusk's opponent, Lech Kaczyński from PiS. Kurski was expelled from PiS for his role in the accusations, and Kaczyński issued an apology in the name of his political party to Tusk.

See also
 Poles in the Wehrmacht

References

Further reading
 Barbara Szczepuła, Dziadek w Wehrmachcie [Grandpa in Wehrmacht], Gdańsk: słowo/obraz terytoria, 2007, .

External links
 TVP i TVN: Dziadek Tuska był w Wermachcie, Wikinews, 15 October 2005
 Dziadek Tuska, collection on journalist essays on the subject

1907 births
1987 deaths
Polish luthiers
Polish people of Kashubian descent
Polish people of World War II
Businesspeople from Gdańsk
Neuengamme concentration camp survivors
People from West Prussia
German Army soldiers of World War II
Deserters
Recipient of the Meritorious Activist of Culture badge